Archduchess Maria Dorothea may refer to:
 Archduchess Maria Dorothea of Austria
 Duchess Maria Dorothea of Württemberg